Kevin Michael Anderson (born 18 May 1986) is a South African former professional tennis player. He achieved his career-high Association of Tennis Professionals (ATP) ranking of world No. 5 on 16 July 2018. He was the first South African to be ranked in the top 5 since Kevin Curren was No. 5 on 23 September 1985.

On 6 February 2011, Anderson defeated Somdev Devvarman in his hometown of Johannesburg to capture the South African Open title for his first ATP Tour-level title. His second ATP title came at the 2012 Delray Beach Open when he defeated Marinko Matosevic. Anderson won his third championship in 2015 at the Winston-Salem Open with a victory over Pierre-Hugues Herbert. He ended 2017 winning the exhibition World Tennis Championship. His fourth title came in February 2018 at the New York Open.

Anderson reached his maiden Grand Slam final at the 2017 US Open, where he lost to Rafael Nadal. In the 2018 Wimbledon semifinals, Anderson reached his second major final by defeating American John Isner in the second-longest match in the history of major tournaments. The match, which lasted 6 hours and 36 minutes, was only beaten in length by the 2010 match between Isner and France's Nicolas Mahut. He then lost to Novak Djokovic in the final in straight sets. On 3 May 2022, Anderson announced his retirement at age 35.

Early years
Anderson started playing tennis at age 6 and was competitive in 800-metre races at school. On the eve of their meeting in the finals at the 2017 US Open, it emerged that as a 12-year old, Anderson regularly competed against future world number one Rafael Nadal on the juniors circuit.

Collegiate career
Anderson played three seasons of college tennis in the United States at the University of Illinois Urbana-Champaign. He was a three-time All-American in singles and two-time All-American in doubles. During his sophomore year (2005–06), he won the national doubles championships with playing partner Ryan Rowe.

In 2007, Anderson led Illinois to a runner-up team finish, losing to host Georgia on their home courts. In the championship dual match, Anderson lost at #1 singles to future ATP top-ten player, John Isner. During the singles tournament, Anderson lost in the semifinals to eventual two-time national champion, Somdev Devvarman of Virginia. In doubles, Anderson and partner, Ryan Rowe, fell short of repeating as champions, losing in the championship match to Marco Born and Andreas Siljeström of Middle Tennessee State in three sets, after having a couple match points.

Professional career highlights

2003–2007: Early career
At age 17, Anderson entered his first professional tournament, winning four main-draw matches in the four-week tournament to earn a world ranking of No. 1178 from his only tournament of the year. He also finished the year with a doubles ranking of No. 902. In November, Anderson entered his third pro tournament and won the Botswana F1 to push his ranking to No. 769. He followed that up the next two weeks in South Africa, reaching the final in F1 and the semifinals in F2 to finish the year ranked No. 665 in singles from just 3 tournaments.

At age 19, Anderson continued to play at the Futures level, exclusively in the United States, reaching the semifinals of USA F21 in August. In November, he played his first Challenger event in Champaign, qualifying and beating No. 192 Jan-Michael Gambill in the first round. He finished the year ranked No. 766.

In 2005, Anderson played his first pro tournaments of the year in June, again in the United States, reaching the finals of USA F13 and F21. He returned to Champaign again in November, beating No. 107 Kevin Kim to reach his first Challenger quarterfinal. He finished the year ranked No. 517. In doubles, he won a pair of USA Futures back to back in June and finished the year ranked No. 530.

In 2006, Anderson again waited until June to play his first tournaments. He repeated as a finalist in USA F12, and then won USA F13 before qualifying two weeks later in the Winnetka Challenger and reaching the final to push his ranking to No. 310. He recorded his first win over a top-100 opponent in the qualifying for the ATP tournament in New Haven, beating No. 88 Chris Guccione, before losing in the main draw to No. 41 Arnaud Clément.

In September 2007 in the Challenger in New Orleans, he needed to qualify to make the main draw in both singles and doubles, and won all 13 matches that week to take the singles and doubles titles, beating four top-200 singles players and the top three seeded doubles teams. His Challenger success in New Orleans helped him to career-high rankings at the end of 2007 of No. 221 in singles and No. 398 in doubles.

2008: First Grand Slam entry
Anderson began 2008 with a bit of success, reaching the quarters of the Challenger in New Caledonia before qualifying in his first Grand Slam attempt in Australia. He lost in the main draw first round to No. 84 Alejandro Falla in 5 sets, but his efforts got his ranking to a career high of No. 190.

At the 2008 Tennis Channel Open in Las Vegas, as a qualifier, he managed to defeat sixth seed Michaël Llodra in straight sets, 6–2, 7–6. In the second round he beat giant John Isner 7–6, 7–5. He beat Evgeny Korolev in his first ever ATP quarter-final 6–2, 6–0. In the semi-finals he won in straight sets against Robby Ginepri to reach his first ever ATP tour final. In the final, he fell to Sam Querrey in 3 sets.

In the second round of the Sony Ericsson Open in Key Biscayne, Florida, he beat Novak Djokovic for his first win against a top-10 player.

At Wimbledon, Anderson and partner Robert Lindstedt of Sweden reached the quarterfinals before losing to the eventual tournament champions, Daniel Nestor and Nenad Zimonjić.

Anderson also represented South Africa in the Beijing Olympics, defeating Komlavi Loglo before losing to Nicolas Kiefer 4–6, 7–6, 4–6 in the singles tournament and losing (with his partner Jeff Coetzee) to Nicolás Almagro and David Ferrer of Spain 6–3, 3–6, 4–6.

2009: Victory at Sanremo Challenger
After a slow start to the year, he won the Sanremo Challenger in May, beating Blaž Kavčič in the final in three sets.

At the Aegon Championships (Queen's Club, London), Anderson won three matches to qualify, and then defeated no. 57 Fabio Fognini in the first round of the main draw, before losing to no. 46 Sam Querrey in the second round.

2010: 3rd Round at US Open and Canadian Masters
At Wimbledon, he was defeated by seventh seed Nikolay Davydenko after winning the first two sets.

Anderson advanced to the semifinals of the 2010 Atlanta Tennis Championships in July, upsetting fifth seed Janko Tipsarević in the first round.

He qualified and reached the third round of the Rogers Cup in Toronto, beating Leonardo Mayer and Sam Querrey before losing to no. 1 Rafael Nadal.

He then won his first Grand Slam match at the US Open over Somdev Devvarman in straight sets and backed it up with a five-set win over 26th seed Thomaz Bellucci.

2011: First Career ATP title
He began the 2011 season by advancing to the semifinals of the Brisbane International Tournament, before losing to Andy Roddick in three sets. He then went on to lose in the first round of the Australian Open to Blaž Kavčič.

At the SA Open, (Anderson's home event), he claimed his maiden ATP Tour title, by beating Indian Somdev Devvarman, rising 19 positions in the ATP rankings to a career high of No. 40.

He reached a career-high of world no. 33 after making the quarterfinals of the 2011 Sony Ericsson Open. At the Atlanta Tennis Championships, Anderson reached the quarterfinals as the second seed, defeating Michael Russell, before losing in straight sets to Gilles Müller. Next at the Legg Mason Tennis Classic, Anderson defeated Chris Guccione in the second round, before being defeated by Victor Troicki in the third round.

At the 2011 Rogers Cup, he defeated Pablo Andújar in straight sets before beating an out-of-sorts Andy Murray in the second round with an easy victory. He was defeated in the third round by Stanislas Wawrinka in a tight three set contest.

2012: Second ATP title
Anderson opened 2012 with a third-round loss at the 2012 Australian Open. He followed it up with a win in Delray Beach, defeating qualifier Marinko Matosevic in the final.

At the French Open, he reached a career-best third round, where he was defeated by seventh seed Tomáš Berdych in five sets.

2013: Grand Slam 4th-round appearance
Anderson started the year at the Sydney International, where he reached the final, but lost to Australian Bernard Tomic in three sets.

At the 2013 Australian Open, he defeated Fernando Verdasco in the third round, but lost to Tomáš Berdych in the fourth round. This was his career best in any Grand Slam event.

He played at Indian Wells, where he knocked out fourth seed David Ferrer. He reached the quarterfinals there before losing to Tomáš Berdych. He reached the fourth round of the French Open, before falling to Ferrer in straight sets. At Wimbledon, he lost in the third round to Berdych. He reached the final in Atlanta in July, but lost his third final of the year in three tiebreaks to John Isner.

2014: Four wins against top-5 opponents

Anderson started the year by reaching the fourth round of the Australian Open, before being knocked out in straight sets by Tomáš Berdych. He then reached the final at Delray Beach, before losing to Marin Čilić in two tiebreaks. At the Mexican Open held in Acapulco, he again reached the final, losing to Grigor Dimitrov in three sets, with tiebreaks in the first and third sets.

In the Indian Wells Masters, Anderson reached the quarterfinals, after beating third seed Stan Wawrinka in three sets. He lost to Roger Federer in straight sets. At the 2014 Madrid Open, he beat Radek Štěpánek, before losing to Tomáš Berdych. He repeated his success of 2013 by again reaching the fourth round in the French Open, before losing to fifth seed David Ferrer in four sets.

He then reached the quarterfinals of the AEGON Championships held at the Queen's Club, London, before losing to Radek Štěpánek. At the Wimbledon Championships he defeated Fabio Fognini to reach the fourth round, where he lost to Andy Murray.

Anderson made it to the quarterfinals of the Masters 1000 event in Toronto after defeating Fognini and Stanislas Wawrinka. At the Cincinnati Masters, he had a disappointing first-round, straight-set exit at the hands of John Isner.

He made it to the third round of the US Open, where he lost to eventual champion Marin Čilić. At the Paris Masters he again defeated Wawrinka to reach the quarterfinals, after which Tomas Berdych beat him. The South African ended the year no. 16 in the ATP year-end rankings.

2015: Top-10 debut
Anderson made the final in Memphis, losing to Kei Nishikori, but he made early exits in Estoril and Madrid. He then at Queen's Club made the final before being defeated by Andy Murray in straight sets. He again reached the fourth round at Wimbledon, where he led eventual champion Novak Djokovic two sets to love, taking both sets through tiebreakers. However, he was unable to sustain his form for the next three sets and eventually lost the match in five sets. Anderson became the champion of the ATP 250 in Winston-Salem, earning his third career singles title. Anderson's big moment came in the US Open, where he defeated Andy Murray, advancing to his first quarterfinals in a Grand Slam after seven attempts. He won the first two sets, then lost the third set via tiebreaker, but after a fourth set, Anderson pulled away, winning the tiebreaker 7–0 and captured the victory. He would next face Stan Wawrinka, whom he had beaten the last four times they played, including once that year. This was their eighth match overall, but the first at Grand Slam level. Wawrinka levelled the head-to-head at 4–4, beating Anderson in straight sets, including a bagel in the third.

Following the US Open, Anderson traveled to Asia for the Japan Open, where he lost in the round of 32 to Gilles Müller. Despite this loss, he reached a career-high ranking of No. 10 on 12 October, the first South African tennis player in the top 10 in 18 years. He then traveled to Shanghai for the Shanghai Masters (tennis), where he was defeated in the quarterfinals by Jo-Wilfried Tsonga. This was followed by the Vienna Open, where he lost to Steve Johnson in the quarterfinals. Traveling to Basel next, he was defeated by yet another American in Donald Young in the Round of 16. He reached the third round in the 2015 BNP Paribas Masters, but failed to capitalise on a match point against Rafael Nadal.

2016: Injury struggles

Anderson started his season at Auckland as the fourth seed. He defeated Robin Haase in the second round, but lost to Jack Sock in the quarterfinals, despite winning the first set. Anderson was then scheduled to play at the Chennai Open, but withdrew due to a left knee injury. Anderson exited the Australian Open early in the first round and was advised to take some time off to sort out problems with his shoulder. He took the break and also had minor surgery on his ankle while he was out. Anderson then returned to Delray Beach as the top seed. He lost the first set of his match against Austin Krajicek in the first round and then retired before the second set.

Anderson did not play again on tour until May at the Madrid Open. He lost in the first round against 13th seed Gaël Monfils. Anderson then played in Rome as the 16th seed. Anderson won his first-round match against Feliciano López, but lost in the second round to Juan Mónaco, despite winning the first set. Anderson then competed in Nice as the third seed. He defeated qualifier Diego Schwartzman, before losing to fifth seed João Sousa. Anderson then played at the French Open as the 18th seed, where he lost in the first round to Stéphane Robert. Anderson started his grass season at Queen's Club. Since he entered late, he had to go through qualifying. Anderson defeated Edward Corrie and Jiří Veselý, both in straight sets, to enter the main draw. He then lost to Bernard Tomic in the first round of the main draw. Anderson then played at Nottingham as the top seed. He defeated Ivan Dodig and 14th seed Fernando Verdasco to reach the quarterfinals, where he lost to sixth seed and eventual champion Steve Johnson. Anderson then played at Wimbledon as the 20th seed. He lost in the first round to Denis Istomin, despite winning the first two sets.

Anderson played at the Citi Open as the ninth seed. He lost in the second round to Malek Jaziri, despite winning the first set. Anderson then played in the Rogers Cup. He won his first-round match against Viktor Troicki. He then defeated sixth seed Dominic Thiem because Thiem had to retire. He then reached the quarterfinals after he defeated 12th seed Bernard Tomic for the first time. Anderson, however, lost to Stan Wawrinka in straight sets. The US Open saw his best performance in a Grand Slam for the year, defeating both Yoshihito Nishioka and Vasek Pospisil in straight sets, before bowing out to Jo-Wilfried Tsonga in the third round, also in straight sets.

2017: US Open final

2017 was a better year for Anderson, despite a slow start. He began the year at the Memphis Open in February, where he lost in the first round to Bosnian Damir Džumhur. He also lost in the first round of the Delray Beach Open to resurgent Juan Martín del Potro.

In March, he made it to the second round of Indian Wells, where he lost to Steve Johnson. In Miami, he again made it to the second round, where he was defeated by Kei Nishikori.

In Houston, he played doubles with Sam Querrey, making it to the semifinals before losing to Dustin Brown and Francis Tiafoe. He then traveled to Barcelona, where he got past Carlos Berlocq and David Ferrer, losing in the third round to eventual champion Rafael Nadal.

In May, he defeated Richard Gasquet in the quarterfinals of Estoril, before succumbing to an in-form Gilles Müller in the semifinals. He had to go through qualifying in Rome, only to lose in the first round to eventual champion Alexander Zverev. He then traveled to Geneva, where he made it to the quarterfinals, falling again to Kei Nishikori in three tight sets. At the French Open, he had to retire from his fourth-round match against Marin Čilić.

Anderson was back in action on the grass-court swing, making it to the second round of Eastbourne, where he lost to Richard Gasquet. At Wimbledon, he made it to the fourth round before falling to Sam Querrey in five sets.

He had his best result at the Citi Open in Washington, where he defeated Dominic Thiem in the second round and Jack Sock in the semifinals to earn a runner-up finish against Alexander Zverev. Anderson also made the quarterfinals in Montréal, again falling to Zverev. After losing in the first round in Cincinnati, he withdrew from Winston-Salem.

Anderson reached the quarterfinals at the 2017 US Open and defeated Sam Querrey in four sets. He defeated Pablo Carreño Busta in the semi-finals. In his first ever Slam final, he lost to Rafael Nadal in three sets.

2018: 4th & 5th ATP titles, Wimbledon final, World No. 5
Anderson began his year at the 2018 Maharashtra Open in Pune, India. He reached the final, but fell 6–7(7–4), 2–6 to Gilles Simon.

His next endeavor was at the 2018 Australian Open, where he lost his first match in five sets to eventual semifinalist Kyle Edmund, despite being two sets up to one.

The inaugural New York Open, his third tournament of the year, yielded his first tournament win of 2018. All of his matches went to three sets; his path to the final included beating American rising star Frances Tiafoe and 2014 US Open finalist Kei Nishikori. He defeated American Sam Querrey in three sets. The win propelled him back into the top 10 since 2015 to be World No. 9, a new high.

This was followed up by his participation in the Mexican Open at Acapulco, where he beat Hyeon Chung in the quarterfinals. He reached the final but lost 4–6, 4–6 to Juan Martín del Potro. He reached the quarter-finals at the first two Masters 1000 events of the year, Miami and Indian Wells, losing to Borna Coric and Pablo Carreño Busta respectively, both times in a third set tiebreak.

At the French Open, Anderson lost to the 5'7" Diego Schwartzman in the fourth round. Schwartzman broke Anderson's serve nine times, the most times Anderson had ever been broken in one match.

At Wimbledon, Anderson was seeded eighth. He defeated Norbert Gombos, Andreas Seppi, 25th seed Philipp Kohlschreiber, and Gaël Monfils to reach his first quarterfinal at the tournament, where he faced eight-time champion, defending champion, and top seed Roger Federer. Federer dominated the match early, quickly claiming the first two sets and holding match points in the third. However, Anderson came back to upset Federer in what became a four-hour, five-set epic, winning 13–11 in the fifth set.

He then faced John Isner in the semifinals, in what became the second longest match in Grand Slam history and the third longest men's singles match ever, lasting 6 hours and 36 minutes, ending 7–6, 6–7, 6–7, 6–4, 26–24. This was also the longest semifinal match in Grand Slam history. By reaching the final, Anderson became the first South African player to reach the Wimbledon men's singles final since Kevin Curren in 1985. He then lost to Novak Djokovic in the final in straight sets, despite having five set point chances in the third. However, with this run to the final, he rose to a new career high of World No. 5.

Anderson saw a strong start to the hard court season at the Rogers Cup, defeating fifth seed Grigor Dimitrov in the quarterfinals before losing in three close sets to Stefanos Tsitsipas in the semifinals. At the US Open, he was seeded fifth, defeating Ryan Harrison, Jeremy Chardy, and 28th seed Denis Shapovalov, being defeated by ninth seed Dominic Thiem in straight sets in the fourth round.

2019: Sixth ATP title
Anderson began his season at the Maharashtra Open in Pune. He defeated Laslo Đere, seventh seed Jaume Munar, third seed Gilles Simon, and Ivo Karlović to win the title.

At the Australian Open, Anderson was seeded fifth. He defeated Adrian Mannarino in four sets before being upset by Frances Tiafoe in the second round.

Anderson was seeded fifth at Indian Wells but withdrew due to a right elbow injury. He was then seeded sixth at the Miami Open and progressed into the quarterfinals, where he was defeated in straight sets by in-form and eventual champion Roger Federer.

2020: Right knee surgery
At the 2020 Australian Open, Anderson lost to Taylor Fritz in five-sets. In February, he underwent surgery on his right knee for a torn meniscus.

2021: Seventh ATP title and 350th ATP tour win

Kevin Anderson rebounded from his knee surgery and won his 7th ATP title at the Hall of Fame Tennis Championships by defeating Jenson Brooksby 7–6, 6–4. The championship victory marked his 350th win on the ATP tour.

2022: Retirement
Anderson announced his retirement from professional tennis on 3 May 2022. He ended his singles career ranked No. 107. He played his last singles match at the 2022 Miami Open where he fell in a tough three sets to Juan Manuel Cerundolo as a lucky loser.

Personal life
Anderson married his college girlfriend, golfer Kelsey O'Neal, in 2011, and they bought a home in Delray Beach, Florida. His daughter, Keira, was born in September 2019. He is a permanent resident of the United States.

Anderson plays the guitar and is a fan of the British rock band Dire Straits and Mark Knopfler.

Career statistics

Grand Slam singles performance timeline

Grand Slam finals: 2 (2 runner-ups)

References

External links

 
 
 
 Kevin Anderson at the Illinois Fighting Illini

South African people of British descent
Illinois Fighting Illini men's tennis players
Olympic tennis players of South Africa
Sportspeople from Champaign, Illinois
Tennis players from Johannesburg
South African emigrants to the United States
South African male tennis players
Tennis people from Illinois
Tennis players at the 2008 Summer Olympics
1986 births
Living people
White South African people
University of Illinois Urbana-Champaign alumni
People from Gulf Stream, Florida